Jala is a traditional kuih from Sabah and Sarawak in Malaysia and Brunei. In Sarawak, it is known as the traditional snack called the "sarang semut" (ant nest) for the Iban people. It is very different from the roti jala in Peninsular Malaysia.

References 

Bruneian cuisine
Malaysian snack foods